Gentle Julia may refer to:

 Gentle Julia (novel), a 1922 work by Booth Tarkington
 Gentle Julia (1923 film), a silent film adaptation
 Gentle Julia (1936 film), a film adaptation